The 18th running of the Tour of Flanders for Women, a women's cycling race in Belgium, was held on 4 April 2021, serving as the 5th event of the 2021 UCI Women's World Tour. It was won for the second time by Annemiek van Vleuten, whose first win in this race came a decade prior.

Teams
Nine UCI Women's WorldTeams and fifteen UCI Women's Continental Teams competed in the race. Out of 144 riders that started the race, there were 111 finishers.

UCI Women's WorldTeams

 
 
 
 
 
 
 
 
 

UCI Women's Continental Teams

Results

See also
 2021 in women's road cycling

References

2021
Tour of Flanders for Women
Tour of Flanders for Women
April 2021 sports events in Belgium